Fat Pig is a play by Neil LaBute. The play premiered Off-Broadway in 2004 and won the 2005 Outer Critics Circle Award for Outstanding Off-Broadway Play. The play had its London premiere in 2008 and was nominated for Laurence Olivier Award for Best New Comedy. The play involves a romantic relationship between a plus-size woman and a young professional man, whose friend denigrates the woman as being "fat". The play was also adapted into an opera in 2022, by composer Matt Boehler.

Plot synopsis 
Fat Pig tells the story of Tom, a stereotypical professional businessman in a large city, who falls for a very plus-size librarian named Helen. They meet in a crowded restaurant at lunchtime and begin speaking to each other. Tom is taken with her brash acceptance of the way people see her and her in-your-face honesty. He asks her for her phone number and they start to date. A couple of weeks later, Carter, Tom's best friend, starts to notice the signs of Tom having a new girlfriend. He obnoxiously pesters him for information about the new girl and in order to get it mentions it in front of a woman from accounting, Jeannie, who has been seeing Tom on-and-off for a while. She gets very upset which gets Tom to admit that he is “sort of” seeing this new woman in his life. Carter asks Tom what he is doing that night, and Tom says he is busy. Carter knows then that he is meeting Helen at a restaurant Tom frequents, Tom denies it and says it is a business dinner with people from the Chicago branch of their firm. Carter, not believing him, stops by the restaurant and sees them together. He approaches them and introduces himself to Helen, and she excuses herself to go to the restroom. While she is gone Carter thoroughly insults her weight and calling her a lot of horrible things ('fat pig' among others), not knowing that this is Tom's new girlfriend. He assumes then that Tom was telling the truth about the people coming in from Chicago and that Helen is one of his business contacts, since he thought that Tom would never date anyone that "fat".

Later that week, Jeannie pays a visit to Tom in his office. She has found out that no people from Chicago came to visit. She demands to know what is going on with him and her and he says that he is not interested in her and will never be again. Earlier, she and Carter had been gossiping about the "fat cow from Chicago", which is how Jeannie found out about the whole thing. So once Tom says that it was not a business dinner, she flips out and smacks him, hurt that he would pick someone like Helen (an obese woman) over her. Carter looks on and sort of apologizes for being rude about Helen, saying that he did not know she was his girlfriend. He asks to see a picture and after a lot of pestering gets one from Tom. He then proceeds to run down the hall and show everyone who laughs behind Tom's back about the "fat pig" that he is dating. Throughout the rest of the play, Carter tries to convince Tom that he should "stick to his own kind".

Meanwhile, Tom and Helen are falling more and more in love. One day, Helen informs Tom that she has been offered a better job in another town but she does not want to leave him. She asks if she can meet his friends, but when he is hesitant, she knows that he is ashamed of her weight. But not wanting to give her that impression, he tells her that she will meet his friends when they have a work barbecue on the beach. The day arrives for the outing, but once they get there they are secluded from everyone with the attendees making jokes and ridiculing Helen's weight behind her back. Seeing that Tom is clearly embarrassed being around her which has now led to him being ostracized by everyone he knows over dating an obese woman, Helen brings up her concerns and gives Tom an ultimatum: either accept all of her and that includes defending her to his friends, or their relationship cannot work. He replies that he cannot handle it and that she should take the job in the other town. Both Tom and Helen walk away from each other, broken hearted.

Character guide 
Tom: The plot's protagonist. Late 20s to early 30s, he is a stereotypical man for his age group, until he meets Helen, who he subsequently falls in love with.
Helen: A quite heavy, though self-confident librarian. She becomes Tom's love interest and the catalyst for his change of view.
Carter: Tom's closest friend at the office. Carter represents the narcissistic and shallow qualities that Tom is trying to overcome. Carter is the play's consummate antagonist.
Jeannie: Another co-worker at Tom's unnamed office firm. She and Tom used to date, but Tom was never fully committed to the relationship. Jeannie's self-confidence is damaged because Tom dumps her for a "fat girl".

Labute provides very few details about the specifics of the characters' lives, beside from the fact that they all work and are in approximately the same age group.

Production history

Off-Broadway premiere 
Fat Pig premiered Off-Broadway at the Lucille Lortel Theatre in an MCC Theater production on November 23, 2004 in previews, officially on December 15. Directed by Jo Bonney, the cast was as follows: Ashlie Atkinson (Helen), Andrew McCarthy (Carter), Jeremy Piven (Tom), Keri Russell (Jeannie) (in her stage debut). This production was hailed as a provocative comedy that made the audience think. David Amsden said in New York Magazine, "You emerge from his plays either praising him for the metaphoric slap in the face or simply wishing you knew where he lived, so you can hunt down the bastard and deliver a literal slap of your own. The guy is doing something right, in short.... His cruel wit and chronicles of immoral moralizers have made him, arguably, the most legitimately provocative and polarizing playwright at work today."

Labute Festival 2006
The play was showcased during the Labute Festival at the Studio Theatre in Washington D.C. The play featured Tyler Pierce as Tom. Kate Debelack played the role of Helen.

2006 Madrid production  
The play opened at Teatro Alcázar in Madrid in January 2006. Directed by Tamzin Townsend and with Luis Merlo as Tom, Teté Delgado as Helen, Iñaki Miramón and Lidia Otón.

2007 West Coast premiere production
The play made its West Coast Bay Area production in San Jose, at City Lights Theatre Company of San Jose, under the direction of Tom Gough, its former Artistic Director. It held a successful run, opening from January 25, 2007, to February 25, 2007, and received high praise.

2007 Boston production
The play made its New England debut in Boston from March 16, 2007 to April 7, 2007 at the Boston Center for the Arts by the SpeakEasy Stage Company. The cast included James Ryen(Tom), Liliane Klein (Helen), Michael Daniel Anderson (Carter), and Laura Latreille (Jeannie).

2007 Los Angeles production
The Los Angeles premiere was May 11, 2007 at the Geffen Playhouse's Audrey Skirball-Kenis Theater, with a cast including Kirsten Vangsness as Helen, Scott Wolf as Tom, Chris Pine as Carter, and Andrea Anders as Jeannie. The play, originally scheduled to run until June 10, 2007, was extended to July 1, 2007, with a new cast: original New York cast member Ashlie Atkinson as Helen, Joseph Sikora as Tom, Jon Bernthal as Carter, and Jamie Ray Newman as Jeannie.

2008 London production
Its United Kingdom premiere runs from 27 May 2008 at the Trafalgar Studios, London, with a cast including Ella Smith as Helen, Robert Webb as Tom, Kris Marshall as Carter and Joanna Page as Jeannie.

In August it was announced that both Marshall and Webb would be stepping down from their roles and be replaced by Kevin Bishop and Nicholas Burns, respectively. Also announced later in the same month was that Page would be stepping down from her role and would be replaced by Kelly Brook and Katie Kerr would replace Ella Smith in October 2008.

On September 11, 2008, the play was shown at the Comedy Theatre.

2009 Colombian production
The Colombia premiere was March, 31 at the Teatro Nacional La Castellana in Bogota, with the cast Constanza Hernández as Helena, Fabián Mendoza as Tommy, Tatiana Rentería as Julia and Juan Sebastián Aragón. Directed by Mario Morgan. http://www.teatronacional.com.co/

2009 Berkeley/East Bay Area production
The play made its East Bay Area premiere in Berkeley, CA at the Aurora Theatre Company. Previews began on October 30, 2009 and opening night was November 5, 2009. The play was directed by Barbara Damashek and featured Boston cast member Liliane Klein as Helen, Jud Williford as Tom, Peter Ruocco as Carter, and Alexandra Creighton as Jeannie. Originally scheduled to run through December 6, 2009, the play was extended one week through December 13, 2009.

The production was hailed by SF Chronicle drama critic Robert Hurwitt, who wrote, "This is LaBute at the best of his bad-boy sensitive mode." Arielle Little wrote in The Daily Californian:
"Playwright Neil LaBute's "Fat Pig"... is an alternately rude and heartwarming play laced with sweet moments, insults and profanity. It is an all-out assault at the image-obsessed, morally craven culture that the current generation constantly is bombarded with and often embraces. And it is so good it is almost painful to watch. It is, in short, the type of theater we need to be seeing."

2010 Philadelphia production
Theatre Horizon produced the play April 9 - May 1, 2010.  It was directed by Matthew Decker and featured Ed Renninger as Tom, Melissa Joy Hart as Helen, Paul Felder as Carter and Erin Mulgrew as Jeannie.

2010 Mexico City production
The show is currently, as of April 2010, being staged in Mexico City at the Teatro Fernando Soler, in Spanish, with the title "Gorda" (literally, 'fat woman'). The play is set in Mexico.

2010 São Paulo production
The show is being staged in São Paulo at Teatro Procópio Ferreira. It premiered in the four of March 2010 and it's being staged until the end of May. The play is titled "Gorda" (literally 'Fat Woman'). It is directed by the Argentinian Daniel Veronese, which also staged this version of the play for two years in Buenos Aires, Argentina

The play is set in Brasil, with the characters names adapted accordingly. Helen (played by Fabiana Karla) became Helena, Tom became Tony (played by Michel Bercovitch, nominated for the Shell award for his performance in this play). Carter, played by Mouhamed Harchouf became Caco and Jeannie became Joana played by Flávia Rubim. This same play was previously presented in Rio de Janeiro with the same cast.

2010 Hong Kong production
Fat Pig made its Asian premiere at Hong Kong Cultural Centre Studio from August 20, 2010 to August 29, 2010. It was translated by Chong Mui-Ngam and directed by Wong Long-Bun. Four young local actors were cast in the lead roles.

2010 Nova Scotia production
Plutonium Playhouse's production ran November 18–21, 2010  as part of its Sex Festival program.  The play was directed by Natasha MacLellan, and starred Michael McPhee as Tom, Jessica Barry as Helen, Matthew Lumley as Carter and Stacy Smith as Jeannie. McPhee, Barry, and Lumley were all nominated for Robert Merritt Awards for the well-received production.

2011 Broadway production
Josh Hamilton as Tom, HeatherJane Rolff as Helen, Dane Cook as Carter, and Julia Stiles as Jeannie were scheduled to star in a production at the Belasco Theatre on April 12, 2011 in previews and officially on April 26, 2011. This would have marked the Broadway directorial debut of Labute as well. However, before the show began it was postponed for financial reasons, with intent to reschedule it for the 2011-12 season instead.

2013 Melbourne production
In February 2013 Melbourne production company Lab Kelpie Productions announced that it would produce the play from 8–20 October 2013 at Chapel Off Chapel in Melbourne. Daniel Frederiksen has been attached to direct with Lyall Brooks and Lulu McClatchy in the title roles of Tom and Helen.

Awards and nominations
Winner of the Outer Critics Circle Award for Outstanding Off-Broadway Play in 2005
Nominated for Laurence Olivier Awards for Best New Comedy in 2005

References

External links
"Washington Post" Review of play
CurtainUp Review

Fat Pig at the "Trafalgar Studios"

Plays by Neil LaBute
Off-Broadway plays
2004 plays